King Charles the Martyr, or Charles, King and Martyr, is a title of Charles I, who was King of England, Scotland and Ireland from 1625 until his execution on 30 January 1649. The title is used by high church Anglicans who regard Charles's execution as a martyrdom. His feast day in the Anglican calendar of saints is 30 January, the anniversary of his execution in 1649. The cult of Charles the Martyr was historically popular with Tories. The observance was one of several "state services" removed in 1859 from the Book of Common Prayer of the Church of England and the Church of Ireland. There remain some churches and parishes dedicated to Charles the Martyr, and his cult is maintained by some Anglo-Catholic societies, including the Society of King Charles the Martyr founded in 1894 and the Royal Martyr Church Union founded in 1906.

Reign

Charles I, head of the House of Stuart, was King of England, Scotland, and Ireland from 27 March 1625 until his death on 30 January 1649. He believed in a sacramental version of the Church of England, called High Anglicanism, with a theology based upon Arminianism, a belief shared by his main political advisor, Archbishop William Laud. Laud was appointed by Charles as the Archbishop of Canterbury in 1633 and started a series of reforms in the Church to make it more ceremonial. This was actively hostile to the Reformist tendencies of many of his English and Scottish subjects. He rejected the Calvinism of the Presbyterians, insisted on an episcopal (hierarchical) form of church government as opposed to presbyterian or congregational forms, and required that the Church of England's liturgy be celebrated with all of the ceremony and vestments called for by the 1604 Book of Common Prayer. Many of his subjects thought these policies brought the Church of England too close to Roman Catholicism. The Parliament of England objected both to Charles's religious policies and to his Personal Rule from 1629 to 1640, during which he never summoned Parliament. These disputes contributed to the English Civil War.

Trial and execution

After the royalists were defeated by the Parliamentarians, Charles was put on trial. He was charged with attempting to govern as an absolute monarch rather than in combination with Parliament; with fighting against his people; with continuing the war after the defeat of his forces (the Second English Civil War); with conspiring after defeat to promote yet another continuation; and with encouraging his troops to kill prisoners of war. He was sentenced to death.

There is some historical debate over the identity of the man who beheaded the King, who was masked at the scene. It is known the regicides approached Richard Brandon, the common Hangman of London, but that he refused, and contemporary sources do not generally identify him as the King's headsman. Ellis's Historical Inquiries, however, name him as the executioner, stating that he stated so before dying. It is possible he relented and agreed to do the deed, but there are others who have been identified. William Hewlett was tried for the murder after the Restoration and convicted. In 1661, two people identified as "Dayborne and Bickerstaffe" were arrested but then discharged. Henry Walker, a revolutionary journalist, or his brother William, were suspected but never charged. Various local legends around England name local figures.

According to Philip Henry, the decapitation was greeted by a moan from the assembled crowd, some of whom then dipped their handkerchiefs in Charles'  blood, thus starting the cult of the Martyr King. Henry was a royalist propagandist; neither Samuel Pepys nor any other eyewitness source corroborates him.

It was common practice for the head of a traitor to be held up and exhibited to the crowd with the words "Behold the head of a traitor!" Although Charles's head was exhibited, the words were not used. In an unprecedented gesture, one of the prominent leaders of the revolutionaries, Oliver Cromwell, allowed the King's head to be sewn back on his body so the family could pay its respects. Charles was buried privately and at night on 7 February 1649, in the Henry VIII vault inside St George's Chapel in Windsor Castle. The King's son, King Charles II, later planned an elaborate royal mausoleum which was never built.

Martyrdom

Charles is regarded by many members of the Church of England as a martyr because, it is said, he was offered his life if he would abandon the historic episcopacy in the Church of England. It is said he refused, however, believing that the Church of England was truly "Catholic" and should maintain the Catholic episcopate. His designation in the Church of England's calendar is "Charles, King and Martyr, 1649".  Mandell Creighton, Bishop of London, wrote "Had Charles been willing to abandon the Church and give up episcopacy, he might have saved his throne and his life. But on this point Charles stood firm: for this he died, and by dying saved it for the future." In fact, Charles had already made an Engagement with the Scots to introduce Presbyterianism in England for three years in return for the aid of Scots forces in the Second English Civil War.

Both high church Anglicans and royalists fashioned an image of martyrdom, and after the 1660 Restoration of the monarchy the Church of England's Convocations of Canterbury and York added the date of Charles's martyrdom to its liturgical calendar (Lesser Festival).

Observance
The Calendar of the Book of Common Prayer included among the red letter days "state services" commemorations of the Gunpowder Plot, the birth and restoration of Charles II, and the execution of Charles I. In addition, a proclamation made at the beginning of each reign from Charles II to Victoria annexed special services for these days to the Prayer Book by royal mandate (approved unanimously by Convocation). Special sermons were preached, and hundreds of sermons on King Charles the Martyr were printed from the 1660s until the late eighteenth century. The title of the service for 30 January was:

In 1859 the State Services were omitted from the Prayer Book by royal and parliamentary authority but without the consent of Convocation. Vernon Staley in 1907 described the deletion as ultra vires and  "a distinct violation of the compact between Church and Realm, as set forth in the Act of Uniformity which imposed the Book of Common Prayer in 1662". Of the three commemorations, only that of King Charles I has been restored in the calendar in the Alternative Service Book of 1980 – although not as a Red Letter Day – and a new collect composed for Common Worship in 2000. The Society of King Charles the Martyr campaigns for restoration in England of the observance to the Book of Common Prayer. It is included in some of the calendars of other Churches of the Anglican Communion.

Dedications

There are Anglican churches and chapels dedicated to Charles King and Martyr in England, Scotland, Ireland, the United States, Australia, and South Africa. The six in England are:
 Church of King Charles the Martyr, Falmouth, Cornwall
 Church of King Charles the Martyr, Peak Forest, Derbyshire
Church of King Charles the Martyr, Potters Bar, Hertfordshire
Church of King Charles the Martyr, Royal Tunbridge Wells, Kent
Church of King Charles the Martyr, Newton-in-Wem, Shropshire
Church of King Charles the Martyr, Shelland, Suffolk

Other churches include:
 Charles Church, Plymouth – not dedicated to Charles as martyr; Charles himself demanded it be named for himself for his financial support. Destroyed in the Blitz; only ruins remain.
 Chapel of the Royal Hospital, Kilmainham, Dublin, Ireland

Former dedications include the Tangier Garrison chapel in 17th-century English Tangier, and a missionary chapel in Wakkanai established by United States Forces Japan personnel.

See also
 Calves' Head Club, which celebrated 30 January in mockery of Charles's death
 Eikon Basilike
 "On the Martyrdom of King Charles I", sermon by Jonathan Swift

References

Citations

Sources 
 Primary
 
 

 Secondary

External links

 Historical documents on Charles as Martyr from Project Canterbury
 The Website of the Society of King Charles the Martyr in England
 Society of King Charles the Martyr official website
 Charles the Martyr: What to Read by Richard Mammana

Anglo-Catholicism
Martyr
Charles
Charles I
January observances
Charles
Protestant martyrs of England